is a Japanese species of plants in the genus Paris in the family Melanthiaceae.

It is native to sub-alpine regions of Japan. A slow growing perennial, it flowers in July. The rare, showy white star-like flower is borne above a single whorl of about eight stem leaves. It prefers cool, humid, shady places.

Genetics 
Paris japonica has the largest genome of any plant yet assayed, about 150 billion base pairs long. An octoploid and suspected allopolyploid hybrid of four species, it has 40 chromosomes.

The flower has 19 billion more base pairs than the previous record holder, the marbled lungfish, whose 130 billion base pairs weigh in at 132.83 picograms per cell. Since then, other organisms have been assayed and reported to have larger genomes; Polychaos dubium may be the current record holder, but the authors of one study suggest treating that measurement with caution because it was taken before the advent of modern genomic methods.

References

External links
 
 
 Rareplants page

Melanthiaceae
Endemic flora of Japan
Plants described in 1878